General elections were held in Tuvalu on 26 March 1998. As there were no political parties, all candidates for the 12 seats ran as independents, with seven of the incumbents retaining their seats. Following the election, Bikenibeu Paeniu was re-elected Prime Minister.

Background
On 18 December 1997 the parliament was dissolved and the general election was held on 26 March 1998. During the election campaign, candidates from the incumbent government and the opposition traded allegations of sexual and financial misconduct.

Results
Seven incumbent members were re-elected, including Bikenibeu Paeniu, Otinielu Tausi, Ionatana Ionatana, Tomasi Puapua and Alesana Seluka, and opposition MPs Koloa Talake and Faimalaga Luka. Two members of previous parliaments were elected, including Kokea Malua of Nanumea, while three members were new to parliament; Lagitupu Tuilimu of Nanumea, Teleke Peleti Lauti of Funafuti and Samuelu Teo of Niutao.  Former Prime Minister Kamuta Latasi, who represented Funafuti, lost his seat.

Aftermath
Paeniu was re-elected Prime Minister on 8 April, defeating Koloa Talake by a vote of 10–2. He subsequently announced the formation of a cabinet consisting of Ionatana Ionatana as Minister for Health, Women and Community Affairs and Minister for Education and Culture, Alesana Kleis Seluka as Minister for Tourism, Trade and Commerce and Minister Finance and Economic Planning, Otinielu Tausi as Minister of Works, Energy and Communications and Kokea Malua as Minister for Natural Resources and the Environment, Minister of Home Affairs and Rural Development and Deputy Prime Minister. Tomu Sione was appointed as Speaker.

Paeniu later resigned following a motion of no confidence on 27 April 1999. Ionatana was subsequently elected Prime Minister on 27 April. He died on 8 December 2000. Lagitupu Tuilimu was acting prime minister from 8 December 2000 to 24 February 2001, with Faimalaga Luka becoming Prime Minister on 23 February 2001. Luka's government lasted until December the same year, when he lost office as the consequence of another motion of no confidence. On 13 December the former Minister of Finance Koloa Talake was appointed Prime Minister.

References

Tuvalu
Elections in Tuvalu
Election
Non-partisan elections
Election and referendum articles with incomplete results